In quantum field theory, fermions are described by anticommuting spinor fields. A four-fermion interaction describes a local interaction between four fermionic fields at a point. Local here means that it all happens at  the same spacetime point. This might be an effective field theory or it might be fundamental.

Relativistic models

Some examples are the following:

Fermi's theory of the weak interaction.
The Gross–Neveu model. This is a four-fermi theory of Dirac fermions without chiral symmetry and as such, it may or may not be massive.
The Thirring model. This is a four-fermi theory of fermions with a vector coupling.
The Nambu–Jona-Lasinio model. This is a four-fermi theory of Dirac fermions with chiral symmetry and as such, it has no bare mass.

Nonrelativistic models

A nonrelativistic example is the BCS theory at large length scales with the phonons integrated out so that the force between two dressed electrons is approximated by a contact term.

In four space-time dimensions, such theories are not renormalisable.

References

Quantum field theory